Vernon Township is a township in Cowley County, Kansas, USA.  As of the 2000 census, its population was 502.

Geography
According to the USGS, it contains two cemeteries: Mount Vernon and Mount Zion.

The stream of Spring Creek runs through this township.

Transportation
Vernon Township contains two airports or landing strips: Oxford Municipal Airport and Richardson Landing Field.

References
 USGS Geographic Names Information System (GNIS)

External links
 US-Counties.com
 City-Data.com

Townships in Cowley County, Kansas
Townships in Kansas